Harvey Airfield, also known as Harvey Field , is a privately owned, public-use airport in Snohomish, Washington. The airfield has one  asphalt runway, one  turf runway, and fourteen hangar bays. It is home to 261 based aircraft including 9 helicopters and 9 multi-engine planes, as well as 19 businesses including a hot-air balloon charter business.

It is included in the Federal Aviation Administration (FAA) National Plan of Integrated Airport Systems for 2017–2021, in which it is categorized as a regional reliver facility.

History

Harvey Airfield was established in 1944 by Noble and Eldon Harvey and Wesley Loback on the Harvey family's property. In 1947, the family added a restaurant, an administration building, and a maintenance shop. The airfield was run by Eldon and Marjorie until Richard and Kandace Harvey began managing airfield operations in the early 1970s.  After Richard Harvey died due to cancer in 1995, Kandace Harvey took over ownership and operation of the airport with her four children.  They manage the airfield to date.

Like many small airports, Harvey Field provides flight training in small airplanes and helicopters. The airport also provides other traditional services offered by aviation fixed-base operators, including avgas and aircraft maintenance. The airport is located outside the Seattle-Tacoma International Airport Class B airspace but is underneath the 30-nm veil that requires an altitude encoding transponder for aircraft equipped with an electrical system.

Notable incidents
In October 1978, a Douglas C-54 Skymaster arrived at Harvey Airfield and landed on then-Runway 32, striking its left wingtip on a dead tree and demolishing a Chevrolet van with its right main landing gear. In spite of damage, the plane landed successfully and later successfully flew out to nearby Arlington Municipal Airport for repairs.

References

Snohomish County Business Journal article on Harvey, July 2006

External links
Harvey Field main site
Snohomish Flying Service
FAA information on Harvey
Harvey Summary at controller.com

Airports in Snohomish County, Washington
Transportation buildings and structures in Snohomish County, Washington
1944 establishments in Washington (state)
Airports established in 1944
Snohomish, Washington